Large Torso Arch (LH 503) is a public art work by English artist Henry Moore located at the Lynden Sculpture Garden near Milwaukee, Wisconsin.

Description
The bronze sculpture is an abstract, organic bone-like archway; it is installed on the lawn.

See also
List of sculptures by Henry Moore
The Arch 1979–1980

References

Further reading
 

Outdoor sculptures in Milwaukee
1963 sculptures
Bronze sculptures in Wisconsin
Abstract sculptures in Wisconsin
1963 establishments in Wisconsin
Sculptures by Henry Moore